Thomas Caulfeild (1688–1747) was an Irish politician.

Caulfeild was born in Chester and educated at  Trinity College, Dublin. He represented  Tulsk from 1715 to 1727 and again from 1741 to 1747.

References

1688 births
1747 deaths
People from Chester
Irish MPs 1715–1727
Irish MPs 1727–1760
Members of the Parliament of Ireland (pre-1801) for County Roscommon constituencies
Alumni of Trinity College Dublin